The Beginner's Guide to Computers is a book about microcomputers and general computing. It was published in 1982 as an accompaniment to the BBC Computer Literacy Project and The Computer Programme.

Its content covers the basics of the history of computing, programming languages, debugging, logic programming, semiconductor memory, printing, ADCs/DACs, flowcharts, as well as some technologies only found in Britain (such as Prestel, Ceefax, ORACLE). The possibilities of networks, robotics, electronic offices and publishing are also considered, with particular reference to the BBC Micro.

Reception 

The book's square shape was described in The New York Times as "clumsy", although this does not stop it from being a "quite decent introduction" which is "easy to read". Those interested in actually using personal computers to "do something" were advised to look elsewhere. The World Yearbook of Education 1982/83: Computers and Education described it as "lucidly written and well laid out with profuse illustrations", noting the use of "appealing cartoons".

References 

Handbooks and manuals
1982 non-fiction books